Hua Lamphong station is a rapid transit station on the Blue Line of the Bangkok MRT. It is located underground on Rama IV Road in front of Bangkok railway station, more commonly known locally as "Hua Lamphong", on the former location of Hua Lamphong railway station, the origin of Paknam Railway, the first railway line in Thailand.

The station provide a direct connection with Bangkok railway station via underground pathway.

Hua Lamphong station used to be the origin of the first phase of the MRT Blue Line (Hua Lamphong–Bang Sue) between 2004–2019.

Station details

Two levels including
 1 Ticket vending machines, exhibition, walkway tunnel to Bangkok railway station.
 2 Platform

Nearby attractions
 Bangkok railway station
 Yaowarat Road
 Wat Traimit (Temple of Golden Buddha)

See also
 Bangkok MRT

References

MRT (Bangkok) stations
Railway stations opened in 2004
2004 establishments in Thailand